Threadworm may refer to:

 Pinworm (parasite)
 Strongyloides stercoralis
 In non-human contexts, nematodes more broadly, from Ancient Greek νῆμα (nêma, nêmatos, 'thread') and -eiδἠς (-eidēs, 'species').

Animal common name disambiguation pages